Portrait of a Venetian woman (La Bella Nani) is an oil painting on canvas depicting a wealthy noblewoman, painted by Paolo Veronese, ca. 1560. The woman, whose identity is unknown, is dressed in the fashions of Venice at the time. The painting is in the Louvre.

Portraits by Paolo Veronese
1560s paintings